Dwight D. Eisenhower Park, also known as Eisenhower City Park is a park located in the Texas Hill Country outside San Antonio. It is managed by the City of San Antonio Parks and Recreation Department.

History
The park was formerly part of the US Army training ground Camp Bullis. It was opened to the public in 1988. The park is named after U.S. President Dwight D. Eisenhower who was originally from Texas and was an army commander at nearby Fort Sam Houston.

Recreation
There are also picnic areas, playground, camp sites and nature trails.

Wildlife such as white-tail deer, armadillos, raccoons, skunks and others live in the park. It is also popular for bird watching.

References

External links
San Antonio Natural Areas Official Site
San Antonio Parks and Recreation Official Site

Parks in Texas
Greater San Antonio
Tourist attractions in San Antonio
Protected areas of Bexar County, Texas